Karkeniaceae is an extinct family in the order Ginkgoales. It contains the single genus Karkenia. It is distinguished by "Ovulate organs consisting of a peduncle and helically arranged, up to about 100 small, orthotropous but incurved ovules; pedicel present; nucellus largely free." Unlike other ginkgoales, the seeds are borne on cone-like aggregations. Ovuluate organs of Karkenia are associated with leaves of the Ginkgoites, Sphenobaiera and Eretmophyllum types. It is known from the Hettangian to Aptian of both Hemispheres.

References 

Ginkgophyta
Prehistoric plant families